This is a list of adult fiction books that topped The New York Times Fiction Best Seller list in 1940. When the list began in 1931 through 1941 it only reflected sales in the New York City area.

The two most popular books that year were How Green Was My Valley, by Richard Llewellyn, which held on top of the list for 13 weeks, and Stars on the Sea by F. Van Wyck Mason, which was on top of the list for 10 weeks.

See also

 1940 in literature
 Lists of The New York Times Fiction Best Sellers
 Publishers Weekly list of bestselling novels in the United States in the 1940s

References

1940
.
1940 in the United States